Aldo Dezi (born 27 June 1939) is a retired Italian sprint canoer who won a C-2 1000 m silver medal at the 1960 Summer Olympics, together with Francesco La Macchia.

References

External links 
 
 

1939 births
Living people
People from Castel Gandolfo
Canoeists at the 1960 Summer Olympics
Italian male canoeists
Olympic canoeists of Italy
Olympic silver medalists for Italy
Olympic medalists in canoeing
Medalists at the 1960 Summer Olympics
Canoeists of Marina Militare
Sportspeople from the Metropolitan City of Rome Capital
20th-century Italian people